The Finland national speedway team are motorcycle speedway national team from Finland.

Speedway World Cup

See also 
 Motorcycle speedway

National speedway teams
Speedway
Team